The Mohawk, Adirondack and Northern Railroad (MA&N)  is a class III railroad operating in Central and Northern New York. Specifically, it serves Oneida, Jefferson, Lewis, and St. Lawrence counties.  It operates over trackage of the former New York Central Railroad.

Class I and II regional railroad partners are CSX Transportation (interchanging in Utica and Carthage) and New York, Susquehanna & Western (interchanging in Utica).

The railroad is a subsidiary of Genesee Valley Transportation Company.

Southern Division

This division operates 45 miles of track from Utica, through Holland Patent, Remsen, Boonville, and terminating in Lyons Falls.

The Adirondack Scenic Railroad has trackage rights over the line from Utica to Remsen.

The southern division also operates a seven-mile spur into the city of Rome off the CSX mainline.  The spur is accessed with trackage rights for thirteen miles over the CSX track from the Utica interchange to the Rome spur junction.

Northern Division

The northern division operates 15.6 miles of track from the CSX interchange in Carthage southeast to Lowville. This trackage is now out of service.

A  spur northeast and east from Lowville to Newton Falls fell into disuse after the closure of a paper mill in Newton Falls, but it recently has been partially refurbished.

References

External links
Official Website

New York (state) railroads